Not to be confused with Ronny Jordans 1993 second album.Quiet Revolution'' is the thirteenth studio album by British-Irish singer Chris de Burgh, released in 1999. Two singles were released from the album: "When I Think of You", which reached number 59 in the UK Singles Chart and number 75 in Germany, and "A Woman's Heart", which reached number 96 in Germany.

Track listing
All tracks written by Chris de Burgh.Note'''
 "When I Think of You" ("Quand Je Pense A Toi") and "A Woman's Heart" ("Le Coeur D'Une Femme") were recorded in French for release in Canada.

Personnel 

 Chris de Burgh – lead and backing vocals
 Peter Gordeno – keyboards
 Phil Palmer – guitars
 Neil Taylor – guitars
 John Giblin – bass
 David Levy – bass
 Tony Kiley – drums
 Andy Duncan – drum programming, percussion 
 Chris White – saxophones 
 Neil Sidwell – trombone
 Steve Sidwell – trumpet
 Chris Cameron – string arrangements (4, 15)
 Richard Hewson – string arrangements (7, 10)
 Peter Oxendale – orchestral agent
 Gavyn Wright – orchestral agent
 The Heart of England Philharmonic – orchestra (4, 7, 10, 15)
 Tommy Blaize – backing vocals
 Hazel Fernandez – backing vocals
 Derek Green – backing vocals
 Helen Hampton – backing vocals
 Katie Kissoon – backing vocals
 Chris Porter – backing vocals

Production 

 Produced by Chris de Burgh and Chris Porter
 Engineered and mixed by Chris Porter and Jason Clift
 Assistant engineer – Andrew Nicholls
 Recorded and mixed at Whitfield Street Recording Studios (London, England).
 Art direction – Tom Bird
 Sleeve design – Rick Lecoat
 Photography – Paul Cox

Charts

References

Chris de Burgh albums
1999 albums
A&M Records albums